Ingvill is a given name. Notable people with the name include:

 Ingvill Måkestad Bovim (born 1981), Norwegian track and field athlete
 Ingvill Raaum (1935–2012), Norwegian politician

See also
 Ingvild

Norwegian given names